The Kativik School Board (KSB; ,  Kativik Ilisarniliriniq) is a school district with territory in Nunavik in northern Quebec; it has an office in the Saint-Laurent area of Montreal and one in Kuujjuaq.

While most Quebec school boards are categorized by language, this district is categorized as a "special-status school board".

History
It was created as part of the James Bay and Northern Quebec Agreement (JBNQA), and in 1975 the school district came into existence.

The district headquarters were placed in Dorval so the administration would be in proximity to the Quebec government. The headquarters were later placed in Notre-Dame-de-Grâce (NDG), Montreal. In 1998 Quebec Minister of Education Pauline Marois stated she would support the headquarters moving to Nunavik.

The provincial education ministry requested that KSB adopt certain reforms in its mathematics and science programs by 2012; when this did not happen, in 2014 the ministry stopped KSB's ability to issue regular high school diplomas effective June 2015; instead "attestation of equivalence of secondary studies" became available. KSB did not inform the students and community of the change until 2017. President of the KSB board Alicie Nalukturuk accused the ministry of ignoring requests for help on issues in the community.

Schools

 Tukisiniarvik School (Akulivik)
 Tarsakallak School (Aupaluk)
 Innalik School (Inukjuak)
 Nuvviti School (Ivujivik)
 Ulluriaq School (Kangiqsualujjuaq)
 Arsaniq School (Kangiqsujuaq)
 Sautjuit School (Kangirsuk)
 Asimauttaq School (Kuujjuaraapik)
 Jaanimmarik School (Kuujjuaq )
 Pitakallak School (Kuujjuaq )
 Iguarsivik School (Puvirnituq) 
 Ikaarvik School (Puvirnituq)
 Isummasaqvik School (Quaqtaq)
 Ikusik School (Salluit)
 Ajagutak School (Tasiujaq)
 Kiluutaq School (Umiujaq)

Former schools
The board formerly operated the Ulluriaq School, previously the Satuumavik School, in Kangiqsualujjuaq.

The district formerly operated the Kativik Senior Education Centre in Dorval, Quebec. In the district's early history, senior high school students had to attend classes there to get a high school diploma. During its history, most students dropped out of the program rather than completing it; the centre was a long distance from Nunavik.

References

External links
 Kativik School Board
 Kativik School Board 
 Kativik School Board 

Nunavik
School districts in Quebec
Saint-Laurent, Quebec
1975 establishments in Quebec
Educational institutions established in 1975